Goliathodes is a genus of moths of the family Crambidae. It contains only one species, Goliathodes shafferi, which is found in New Guinea.

References

Spilomelinae
Taxa named by Eugene G. Munroe
Crambidae genera
Monotypic moth genera